Terry Crouch (July 6, 1959 – May 8, 2011) was an American football offensive lineman. He played for the Oklahoma Sooners (1978–1981) and Baltimore Colts (1982).

He died after a long illness in 2011.

References

1959 births
2011 deaths
Players of American football from Dallas
American football offensive guards
Oklahoma Sooners football players
All-American college football players
Baltimore Colts players